Northwest Angle 33B is a First Nations reserve in Kenora District, Ontario. It is one of three reserves for the Northwest Angle 33 First Nation.

References

Saulteaux reserves in Ontario
Communities in Kenora District